The women's 4 × 100 metres relay event at the 1932 Summer Olympics took place on August 7.

Results

Final
As only six teams had entered, the teams requested that they run a straight final, which the officials accepted.

The US team narrowly defeated the Canadians in a close and exciting contest: both teams were credited with a new world record.

Key: WR = world record

References

Women's 4x100 metre relay
Relay foot races at the Olympics
4 × 100 metres relay
1932 in women's athletics
Women's events at the 1932 Summer Olympics